The 2009–10 season was the 113th season of competitive football in Scotland.

Overview
 St Johnstone are competing in the Scottish Premier League for the fifth time, after being promoted as First Division champions last season. St Johnstone's last season in the top-flight was the 2001–02 season.
 Raith Rovers are competing in the First Division after being promoted as Second Division champions.

Notable events

 5 August – Livingston are demoted from the First Division to the Third Division in response to the club being deemed in breach of league rules after going into administration and, briefly, liquidation. As a result, Airdrie United are reassigned to the First Division and Cowdenbeath to the Second Division.

Transfer deals

Managerial changes

League Competitions

Scottish Premier League

Scottish First Division

Scottish Second Division

Scottish Third Division

Scottish Premier Under-19 League

Honours

Cup honours

Non-league honours

Senior

Junior
West Region

East Region

North Region

Individual honours

PFA Scotland awards

SFWA awards

Scottish clubs in Europe

Summary

 All teams are eliminated.
 Current UEFA coefficients: Teams and Country

Rangers

Celtic

Heart of Midlothian

Aberdeen

Falkirk

Motherwell

National teams

Scotland national team

Deaths
 26 July – Graham Potter, 30, Hamilton goalkeeper.
 29 July – Paul McGrillen, 37, Motherwell, Falkirk, Partick Thistle and Airdrieonians striker.
 13 August – Brian McLaughlin, 54, Celtic, Ayr United, Motherwell, Hamilton Academical and Falkirk winger.
 1 September – John Buchanan, 74, Hibs and Raith Rovers forward.
 19 September – Stevie Gray, 42, Aberdeen and Airdrie winger.
 25 September – David Will, 72, Brechin City chairman, Scottish Football Association president and FIFA vice-president.
 8 October – Alex McCrae, 89, Hearts and Falkirk forward; Stirling Albion and Falkirk manager.
 3 November – Archie Baird, 90, Aberdeen, St Johnstone and Scotland forward.
 19 November – Frank Beattie, 76, Kilmarnock player; Albion Rovers and Stirling Albion manager.
 1 December – Neil Dougall, 88, Birmingham City, Plymouth Argyle and Scotland player.
 3 January – Gus Alexander, 75, Southport, Workington and York City wing half.
 7 January – Alex Parker, 74, Falkirk and Scotland defender.
 13 January – Tommy Sloan, 84, Hearts and Motherwell winger
 1 February – Bobby Kirk, 82, Dunfermline, Raith Rovers and Hearts defender.
 7 February – Bobby Dougan, 83, Hearts, Kilmarnock and Scotland defender.
 12 February – Willie Polland, 75, Raith Rovers and Hearts defender.
 18 February – Alan Gordon, 65, Hearts, Dundee United, Hibs and Dundee striker.
 20 February – Bobby Cox, 76, Dundee defender.
 22 February – Bobby Smith, 56, Hibs and Dunfermline player.
 23 February – Gerry Neef, 63, Rangers goalkeeper.
 28 February – Adam Blacklaw, 72, Burnley, Blackburn Rovers and Scotland goalkeeper.
 11 March – Willie MacFarlane, 79, Hibs, Raith Rovers and Morton defender; Stirling Albion, Hibs and Meadowbank manager.
 12 March – Hugh Robertson, 70, Dundee, Dunfermline, Arbroath and Scotland winger.
 11 April – Billy Fulton, 72, Ayr United, Falkirk and St Mirren wing half.
 21 April – Sammy Baird, 79, Clyde, Rangers, Hibs, Third Lanark, Stirling Albion and Scotland player; Stirling Albion manager.
 1 June – John Hagart, 72, Berwick Rangers wing half; Hearts and Falkirk manager.

Notes and references

 
Seasons in Scottish football